Kim Hwan-jin  (born June 22, 1955, in South Korea) is a South Korean former professional boxer who competed from 1977 to 1983. He won the World Boxing Association light flyweight title in 1981.

Professional career

Kim turned professional in 1977 and compiled a record of 18-0-2 before facing and defeating Mexican boxer Pedro Flores, to win the WBA Light flyweight title. He would defend the title against former flyweight champion Alfonso López in his next fight He would lose go on to lose the title to Japanese contender Katsuo Tokashiki, he retired shortly after the fight.

Professional boxing record

See also
List of Korean boxers
List of world light-flyweight boxing champions

References

External links

 

1955 births
Living people
South Korean male boxers
Light-flyweight boxers
World light-flyweight boxing champions
World Boxing Association champions